

Literary figures 
 TK Ramanuja Kavirajar, Tamil epic poet, playwright and humanitarian
Henry Alfred Krishnapillai, composer of Ratchanya Yathreegam
Daniel Selvaraj, Sahitya Academi Award-winning Tamil writer
Vannadhasan, Sahitya Academy Award - winning Tamil writer

Freedom fighters 
 Puli Thevar
 Muhammad Ismail Rowther (Quaid-e-Millat—"Leader of the Nation")

Politicians
 Vaiko, General Secretary, Marumalarchi Dravida Munnetra Kazhagam (MDMK)
 S. Chellapandian, speaker (1962–1967)
 R. Avudaiyappan, speaker (2006–2011)
 P. H. Pandian, speaker (1984–1988)
 M.Appavu , Speaker ( From 2021)

Academics
Subrahmonian Machendranathan (born 1954), government of India, chairperson of Airports Economic Regulatory Authority

Artists

Actors
 Delhi Ganesh
 Inigo Prabhakar
 Nellai Siva

Musical directors
 Bharadwaj

Directors
 Kathir
 Vikraman
 Visu
 Mari Selvaraj 
 S.J Suryah 
 Dharani
 Durai
 A. Venkatesh

Businesspersons
 T. V. Sundaram Iyengar, founder of TVS group
 Shiv Nadar, founder of HCL
 V. G. Panneerdas, founder of VGP group
 P. Rajagopal, founder of Saravana Bhavan
 N.Srinivasan , Indian industrialist. He is a former Chairman of the International Cricket Council (ICC) and former President of the BCCI, the governing body for cricket in India. He is also the managing director of India Cements Limited.
 S.Gnanathiraviam, Founder Annai Groups, Member of Parliament, Tirunelveli Constituency.

Sportspeople
 Vijay Shankar (cricketer)

References

List
TIRUNELVELI